Hypagyrtis is a genus of moths in the family Geometridae erected by Jacob Hübner in 1818.

Species
 Hypagyrtis brendae Heitzman, 1975
 Hypagyrtis caesia (Herrich-Schaffer, 1892)
 Hypagyrtis esther (Barnes, 1928)
 Hypagyrtis globulariae (Guerin-Meneville, 1844)
 Hypagyrtis pallidaria Warren, 1907
 Hypagyrtis piniata (Packard, 1870)
 Hypagyrtis unipunctata (Haworth, 1809)

Taxonomy
This genus has been placed in various tribes over time: Forbes (1948) placed it in Melanolophiini, McGuffin (1977) moved it to Boarmiini. Hodges et al. (1983) moved it to Bistonini and finally Rindge (1985) moved it back to Boarmiini.

References

Boarmiini
Geometridae genera